Strikeforce: Melendez vs. Masvidal was a mixed martial arts event held by Strikeforce. The event took place on December 17, 2011 at the Valley View Casino Center in San Diego, California, United States.

Background
The main event between Melendez and Masvidal was briefly in question with Dana White's announcement that Melendez was UFC bound, but the match went on as planned.

Keith Jardine was expected to make his Middleweight debut at this event. However, he would instead debut at Strikeforce: Rockhold vs. Jardine the following year.

The Bowling/Peoples bout was supposed to be fought at Welterweight, however it was changed to a 179-pound catchweight. Peoples still missed weight and the fight went on as a 181-pound catchweight fight with Peoples fined 20 percent of his purse.

The bout between Devin Cole & Gabriel Salinas-Jones was the last heavyweight fight in Strikeforce's full Heavyweight division. Two days after this event was held, Strikeforce announced the end of the division (save for Heavyweight Grand Prix Tournament finalists Josh Barnett & Daniel Cormier) due to a lack of depth, and six of the promotion's remaining heavyweight fighters were folded into the UFC shortly afterwards.

Former World Extreme Cagefighting announcer Joe Martinez announced this event in place of Jimmy Lennon Jr., as Lennon was announcing that same night's Showtime-broadcast Super Six World Boxing Classic boxing card headlined by Carl Froch & Andre Ward.

Results

Reported payout
The following is the reported payout to the fighters as reported to the California State Athletic Commission. It does not include sponsor money or locker room bonuses.
 Gilbert Melendez: $150,000 (no win bonus) def. Jorge Masvidal: $23,000
 Cris Cyborg: $66,000 (includes $33,000 win bonus) def. Hiroko Yamanaka: $8,000
 Gegard Mousasi: $150,000 (no win bonus) def. Ovince St. Preux: $17,000
 KJ Noons: $65,000 (includes $30,000 win bonus) def. Billy Evangelista: $20,000
 Caros Fodor: $20,000 (includes $10,000 win bonus) def. Justin Wilcox $12,000
 Roger Bowling: $14,000 (includes $7,000 win bonus) def. Jerron Peoples: $2,000
 Devin Cole: $12,000 (includes $6,000 win bonus) def. Gabriel Salinas-Jones: $3,000
 Eddie Mendez: $6,000 (includes $3,000 win bonus) def. Fernando Gonzalez: $3,000
 Herman Terrado: $6,000 (includes $3,000 win bonus) def. Chris Brown: $3,000

References

Melendez vs. Masvidal
2011 in mixed martial arts
Mixed martial arts in San Diego
2011 in sports in California
Events in San Diego